David Wright (born 10 April 1965) is a former English badminton international player and two times English National doubles champion.

Biography 
Wright who represented Yorkshire became an English National doubles champion after winning the English National Badminton Championships men's doubles title with Nick Ponting in 1991. He then repeated the success two years in 1993 later but this time he partnered Julian Robertson.

Wright represented Great Britain at the 1992 Olympic Games playing in the men's doubles with Nick Ponting. In the first round they beat German pair Stefan Frey and Stephan Kuhl, but defeated in the second round to Indonesian pair Rexy Mainaky and Ricky Subagja.

Achievements

IBF World Grand Prix 
The World Badminton Grand Prix sanctioned by International Badminton Federation (IBF) since 1983.

Mixed doubles

IBF International 
Men's doubles

Mixed doubles

References

External links 
 

1965 births
Living people
Sportspeople from Derbyshire
English male badminton players
Badminton players at the 1992 Summer Olympics
Olympic badminton players of Great Britain